Friedl is a Southern German diminutive variation of the name Fried - or alternately, a diminutive of the feminine given names Elfriede and Frederika. Notable people with the name include:

Given name
Friedl Behn-Grund (1906–1989), German cinematographer
Friedl Czepa (1898–1973), Austrian actress
Friedl Däuber (1911–1997), German alpine and cross-country skier
Friedl Dicker-Brandeis (1898–1944), Austrian artist and educator 
Friedl Haerlin (1901–1981), German actress
Friedl Hardt (1919–1991), German actress
Friedl Iby (1905–1960), German gymnast 
Friedl Kjellberg (1905-1993), Austrian-born Finnish ceramist
Friedl Kubelka (orn 1946), British-Austrian photographer, filmmaker and visual artist
Friedl Murauer (born 1938), Austrian hurdler
Friedl Rinder (1905–2001), German chess master

Surname
René Friedl, East German-German luger.
Sigmund Friedl, Austrian philatelist, stamp dealer and forger
T. J. Friedl (born 1995), American baseball player
Marco Friedl (born 1998), Austrian footballer
Thomas Peter Friedl, German film producer

See also
Friedel

Feminine given names
German feminine given names
German-language surnames
Surnames from given names